The Wildwood City School District is a comprehensive community public school district that serves students in pre-kindergarten through twelfth grade from Wildwood, in Cape May County, New Jersey, United States. Its headquarters are on the grounds of Wildwood Middle School and Wildwood High School.

As of the 2019–20 school year, the district, comprised of three schools, had an enrollment of 938 students and 92.3 classroom teachers (on an FTE basis), for a student–teacher ratio of 10.2:1.

The district is classified by the New Jersey Department of Education as being in District Factor Group "A", the lowest of eight groupings. District Factor Groups organize districts statewide to allow comparison by common socioeconomic characteristics of the local districts. From lowest socioeconomic status to highest, the categories are A, B, CD, DE, FG, GH, I and J.

For ninth through twelfth grades, students from North Wildwood, West Wildwood and Wildwood Crest attend Wildwood High School as part of sending/receiving relationships.

History
The district formed in 1912 with the merger of Wildwood Borough and Holly Beach Borough school systems. The first school in the Wildwoods opened in 1882. After 1934, the city was at that time divided between the Glenwood Avenue and Wildwood High building zones for elementary school, with Garfield Avenue as the boundary; the Wildwood High building had grades 1-12 at the time. Now all areas of Wildwood City are zoned to the same two schools.

Schools
Schools in the district (with 2019–20 enrollment data from the National Center for Education Statistics) are:
Elementary school
Glenwood Elementary School with 470 students in grades PreK-5
Travis LaFerriere, Principal
The initial building opened in 1904, and the current building was established in 1955.
Middle school
Wildwood Middle School with 186 students in grades 6-8
Phillip Schaffer, Principal
Mary Beth Clevenger, Assistant Principal
High school
Wildwood High School with 245 students in grades 9-12
Phillip Schaffer, Principal
Mary Beth Clevenger, Assistant Principal
Sean Olson, Assistant Principal / Athletic Director

Former schools
Previously the district maintained Elementary School #1, for grades 5 and 6, at 4300 Pacific Avenue (at the site of the high school).

There was the Andrew Avenue School, a K-8 school which opened in 1886 and closed in 1934. A park was placed where it was.

Beginning in 1915, in the era of de jure educational segregation in the United States, Arctic Avenue School #4, with four classrooms, had segregated facilities for black children for grades 1-6. It stopped operations in 1949. By 1948 Wildwood's elementary took both white and black students but maintained separate classrooms on the basis of race.

Administration
Core members of the district's administration are:
John K. Kummings, Superintendent
Jason Fuscellaro, Business Administrator / Board Secretary

Board of education
The district's board of education, comprised of nine members, sets policy and oversees the fiscal and educational operation of the district through its administration. As a Type II school district, the board's trustees are elected directly by voters to serve three-year terms of office on a staggered basis, with three seats up for election each year held (since 2012) as part of the November general election. The board appoints a superintendent to oversee the day-to-day operation of the district. A non-voting board member represents North Wildwood

References

External links
Wildwood Public School District

 
School Data for the Wildwood Public School District, National Center for Education Statistics

West Wildwood, New Jersey
Wildwood, New Jersey
Wildwood Crest, New Jersey
North Wildwood, New Jersey
1912 establishments in New Jersey
Educational institutions established in 1912
New Jersey District Factor Group A
School districts in Cape May County, New Jersey